A list of American films released in 1940. American film production was concentrated in Hollywood and was dominated by the eight Major film studios MGM, Paramount, Warner Bros., 20th Century Fox, RKO, Columbia, Universal and United Artists. Other significant production and distribution companies included Republic, Monogram and PRC.

Rebecca won Best Picture at the Academy Awards.

#

A

B

C–D

E–F

G–H

I–J

K–L

M–N

O–R

S–T

U–Z

Serials

Shorts

See also
1940 in film
1940 in the United States

References

External links

1940 films at the Internet Movie Database

1940
Films
Lists of 1940 films by country or language